The Burundi national rugby union team represents Burundi in international rugby union. The nation are a member of the International Rugby Board (IRB) and have yet to play in a Rugby World Cup tournament. The Burundi national rugby team played their first international in 2003 - losing to Uganda. They participate annually in the CAR Castel Beer Trophy. However, in the 2007 tournament Burundi withdrew for financial reasons.

History

Rugby has been played in Burundi since the 1970s, first among Belgian players who mixed during the 1980s with many French residents. The first officially registered rugby team was the “Intambwe Rugby Club”. The first presidents were Stanislas Mandi and Christian Taupiac. Among the greatest players are Marc Bourgeois, Charles Mugiraneza, “Okume”, Bernard Bordes, Patrice Ndindakumana, Lilian Campan, Louis Riboli, and Simeon Sahabo. The IRC has played international matches against the French, Rwandese and Kenyan teams.

External links
 Burundi on IRB.com
 Burundi on rugbydata.com

African national rugby union teams
Rugby union in Burundi
National sports teams of Burundi